All Saints Anglican Church  is a historic Carpenter Gothic style Anglican church building located in English Harbour, Newfoundland and Labrador, Canada.

History
Built in 1888-1889 of wood, its steep pitched roof and lancet windows are typical of Gothic Revival churches. The church's historic cemetery contains the graves of many area pioneers, including the victims of the Trinity Bay Disaster of 1892 in which numerous fishermen hunting seals in the bay were caught in a sudden freezing storm.

All Saints Church including its cemetery is a provincial heritage site as designated by the Heritage Foundation of Newfoundland and Labrador on May 7, 2005. . The English Harbour Arts Association is dedicated to preserving All Saints and to creating "an economically viable cultural centre."

References

External links
 English Harbour Arts Association

Carpenter Gothic church buildings in Canada
Anglican church buildings in Newfoundland and Labrador
19th-century Anglican church buildings in Canada
Heritage sites in Newfoundland and Labrador